The 2010–11 IFA Championship (known as the Ladbrokes.com Championship for sponsorship reasons) was the third season since its establishment after a major overhaul of the league system in Northern Ireland. The Championship was divided into two divisions, with the clubs in both divisions having intermediate status. Championship 1 served as the second tier of Northern Irish football, with Championship 2 as the third tier. Loughgall were the defending champions of Championship 1.

In Championship 1, Carrick Rangers secured the title and promotion to the Premiership on 2 May 2011, after Limavady United failed to beat Ballymoney United, leaving them 7 points behind with only two games left to play. Limavady United finished as runners-up but were ineligible for promotion as they did not gain the required licence from the IFA. As a result, the promotion/relegation play-off did not take place. Ballymoney United and Ballyclare Comrades finished in the bottom two, and were relegated to next season's Championship 2.

In Championship 2, Warrenpoint Town were playing their first ever season as an intermediate club, and they went on to win the Championship 2 title after only one season in the division. With the title came promotion to next season's Championship 1. Also promoted were Tobermore United, who finished as runners-up.

Chimney Corner finished bottom of Championship 2 for the second successive season, but avoided relegation when Dollingstown, playing in the Mid-Ulster Football League Intermediate A division (one tier below Championship 2), finished as league champions but were denied promotion to Championship 2 when they were later found to have fielded an ineligible player in eight league matches. As a result, Dollingstown were deducted all the points that they had gained in the matches the player had taken part in, demoting the club to 4th place in the final league table. The club appealed the decision and took their case all the way to the High Court, but it was dismissed. Tandragee Rovers were crowned champions of the division instead, but did not apply for entry to Championship 2. If Dollingstown had won their case they would have been promoted to Championship 2, with Chimney Corner being relegated.

Team changes from 2009–10
Promoted from Championship 1 to IFA Premiership
 Donegal Celtic (2nd in Championship 1)

Relegated from IFA Premiership to Championship 1
 Institute (12th in IFA Premiership)

Promoted from Championship 2 to Championship 1
 Harland & Wolff Welders (1st in Championship 2)
 Dergview (2nd in Championship 2)

Relegated from Championship 1 to Championship 2
 Coagh United (13th in Championship 1)
 Armagh City (14th in Championship 1)

Elected to Championship 2
 Warrenpoint Town

Championship 1

Stadia and locations

League table

Results
Each team plays every other team twice (once at home, and once away) for a total of 26 games.

Championship 2

Stadia and locations

League table

Results
Each team plays every other team twice (once at home, and once away) for a total of 30 games.

References

NIFL Championship seasons
North
2010–11 in Northern Ireland association football